Grammosciadium is a genus of flowering plants belonging to the family Apiaceae.

Its native range is Turkey to Iran.

Species:

Grammosciadium cornutum 
Grammosciadium daucoides 
Grammosciadium macrodon 
Grammosciadium scabridum

References

Apioideae
Apioideae genera